The South Creek or Wianamatta, a creek that is part of the Hawkesbury-Nepean catchment, is located on the Cumberland Plain, also referred to as Greater Western Sydney, New South Wales, Australia.

Course and features

In its upper catchment, the creek forms the boundary between the suburbs of Oran Park and Catherine Field. The creek flows generally north, joined by seventeen tributaries including Badgerys Creek, Kemps Creek, Ropes Creek and Eastern Creek, until reaching its confluence with the Hawkesbury River, near Windsor. The creek descends  over its  course.

From source to mouth, the creek flows through or forms the boundary of the suburbs of Bringelly,  Rossmore, Badgerys Creek, Kemps Creek, Claremont Meadows, Orchard Hills, Werrington, St Marys, Werrington County, Dunheved, Llandilo, Shanes Park, Berkshire Park, Windsor Downs, Riverstone, Vineyard, Mulgrave, Windsor, McGraths Hill and Pitt Town Bottoms.

Tributaries 
The South Creek or Wianamatta is joined by Lowes Creek and Rileys Creek at Bringelly; by Thompsons Creek at Rossmore; by Badgerys Creek and by Kemps Creek at the suburb of Badgerys Creek; by Cosgrove Creek at Luddenham; by Blaxland Creek at Orchard Hills; by Byrnes Creek at St Marys; by Claremont Creek at Werrington; by Werrington Creek at Werrington County; by three unnamed creeks at Llandilo, Marsden Park, and Riverstone; by Ropes Creek at Shanes Park; by Eastern Creek at Vineyard; by McGraths Hill Wetlands and by McKenzies Creek at McGraths Hill.

Etymology 
Wianamatta is an Aboriginal word of the Dharug language, meaning 'mother place'. Evidence of early Aboriginal people has been found in several locations within the Blacktown Local government area. Shell middens from the Darug people have been found near the sewage treatment plant on Breakfast Creek and South Creek.

South Creek was dual-named as Wianamatta on 28 March 2003 by the Geographical Names Board of New South Wales (GNB).

It was dual-named after a submission that the name be changed. However, a lengthy investigation followed, and after consultation with local Aboriginal Land Councils it was decided after extensive workshops carried by the GNB, that instead, a dual-naming proposal should be pursued instead. Following that decision, the GNB carried out an extensive consultation throughout the entire state of NSW, contacting all Aboriginal land councils on record as well as placing entries in every prominent and regional newspaper explaining the proposal and inviting comments.

History

After James Ruse sold his Experiment Farm at Parramatta, in January 1794 he obtained a grant of land at the junction of the Hawkesbury and South Creek (which for a time was known as Ruse's Creek).

A township of South Creek used to exist near St Marys. The name only existed for a few years in the early settlement of New South Wales and now it is part of St Marys/Dunheved. One of its pioneer settlers was Thomas Jamison (1753–1811) who arrived with the First Fleet and became Surgeon-General of New South Wales in 1801.  Jamisontown in the Penrith area is also named after him.

See also 

 1813 crossing of the Blue Mountains
 St Clair
 Rivers of New South Wales

References

External links
UBD Sydney Directory
Sydway Street Directory Online
Google Earth Satellite Pictures

Creeks and canals of Sydney
Hawkesbury River